The General Sánchez Cerro Province is the smallest of three provinces in the Moquegua Region of Peru. The capital of the province is Omate. The province was named after the former Peruvian army officer and president Luis Miguel Sánchez Cerro.

Boundaries
North: Arequipa Region
East: Puno Region
South: Mariscal Nieto Province
West: Arequipa Region

Geography 
One of the highest peaks of the province is the Ubinas volcano. Other mountains are listed below:

Political division
The province is divided into eleven districts, which are:

Omate
Chojata
Coalaque
Ichuña
La Capilla
Lloque
Matalaque
Puquina
Quinistaquillas
Ubinas
Yunga

Ethnic groups 
The province is inhabited by indigenous citizens of Aymara and Quechua descent. Spanish, however, is the language which the majority of the population (60.36%) learnt to speak in childhood, 37.45% of the residents started speaking using the Quechua language and 1.98% using Aymara (2007 Peru Census).

See also
 Jukumarini Lake

References

Provinces of the Moquegua Region